The Dukayniyya Shia (named for one of its leaders, Abu Nu'aym al-Fadl ibn al-Dukayn) were a sect of the Zaidi branch of Shia Islam. The Dukayniyya Shia were led by Abu Nu'aym al-Fadl ibn al-Dukayn and Ibrahim ibn al-Hakam.

Beliefs
The Dukayniyya Shia had the following beliefs:
They believed that the Imams after Muhammad were (in chronological order):
Ali, then
Hasan ibn Ali, then
Husayn ibn Ali, then
Ali ibn Husayn ibn Ali, then
Zayd ibn Ali ibn Husayn ibn Ali, then
Yahya ibn Zayd ibn Ali, then
The Imam is any male from the descendants of either Hassan or Husayn who arises and openly seeks the Imamate and is knowledgeable and just.
They believed in aiding and revolting along with anyone who was opposing evil and upholding goodness.
They believed that the world will always have an Imam and never be without one.
They believed Muhammad’s followers fell into unbelief after his death because they did not uphold the Imamate of Ali, but instead accepted Abu Bakr as the first leader of the Muslim community after Muhammad.
They had similar beliefs to the Jarudiyya Zaidi Shia and the Mu'tazili with regards to the transcendent unity of God, the promise, the threat, justice, and other doctrines.

See also
Islamic schools and branches
List of extinct Shia sects

References
An Ismaili heresiography: the "Bāb al-shayṭān" from Abū Tammām's Kitāb al ..., By Wilferd Madelung, Paul Ernest Walker, pg.90-91

Notes

Shia Islamic branches
Zaidiyyah
Schisms in Islam
Medieval Islamic world